The Journal of Aesthetics and Art Criticism is a quarterly peer-reviewed academic journal covering the study of aesthetics and art criticism. It was published by Wiley-Blackwell on behalf of the American Society for Aesthetics up to January 2021 when it shifted to Oxford University Press.

External links 
 
 

Aesthetics journals
Wiley-Blackwell academic journals
Quarterly journals
Publications established in 1941
English-language journals
Academic journals associated with learned and professional societies